Black Wallachia, Black Vlachia or Black Wallachians may refer to:

 Wallachia
 Moldavia
 Morlachia

Eastern Romance people